John L. Gaunt (June 4, 1924 in Syracuse, New York – October 26, 2007 in Desert Hot Springs, California) was an American photographer.  He won the 1955 Pulitzer Prize for Photography.

Born as the only child to a stockbroker, Gaunt moved and grew up in Hermosa Beach, California. Growing up with his future wife, Mary Elise, he graduated from Redondo Union High School. He served in the United States Army Air Forces during World War II. He studied at Compton College and graduated from University of Southern California with a degree in zoology. Gaunt married Mary Elise in the late 1940s, and the two had two daughters: Jane and Abigail. He worked for the Los Angeles Times from October 1950 to 1988.

His 1955 award-winning photo entitled "Tragedy by the Sea" depicted the morning of 2 April 1954 when his neighbors, young Hermosa couple John and Lillian McDonald, stood together beside a violent sea that had just taken their infant son, Michael, away. The photo made the front page of the Los Angeles Times the following morning. As well as the Pulitzer, the photograph won an Associated Press Managing Editor's Award, and a prize from the California-Nevada Associated Press.

References

External links
 

20th-century American photographers
Pulitzer Prize for Photography winners
People from Desert Hot Springs, California
People from Hermosa Beach, California
Artists from Syracuse, New York
1924 births
2007 deaths
Journalists from California
Journalists from New York (state)
20th-century American journalists
American male journalists
United States Army Air Forces personnel of World War II
University of Southern California alumni
Photographers from New York (state)
Photographers from California
American photojournalists